Ferocactus viridescens is a species of flowering plant in the cactus family Cactaceae. This rare barrel cactus is known by several common names, including coast barrel cactus, keg cactus and San Diego barrel cactus. Most of its native range in the United States is in San Diego County, California, where it is threatened by development, agriculture, and other alterations in its habitat. It is also found in northern Baja California, Mexico.

The flesh is bright green and arranged into several ribs covered in arrays of long spines. The spines, which stick straight out and may curve slightly, are red when new, dulling to gray or tan. The cactus bears yellow to greenish flowers with red or pink scales. The fruit is yellow or red.

The Latin specific epithet viridescens means "turning green".

It has gained the Royal Horticultural Society's Award of Garden Merit.

References

External links
Jepson Manual Treatment
USDA Plants Profile
Photo gallery

viridescens
Cacti of the United States
Flora of Baja California
Flora of California
Natural history of the California chaparral and woodlands
Natural history of San Diego County, California